

Passenger railroads
Honolulu Rail Transit (HRT, currently undergoing testing, first segment scheduled to open December 2022)

Heritage and Scenic Railroads
Hawaiian Railway Society
Kauai Plantation Railway
Lahaina, Kaanapali and Pacific Railroad

Defunct railroads
Ahukini Terminal and Railway Company
Hawaii Railway
Hawaii Consolidated Railway
Hawaiian Railroad
Hilo Railroad
Kahului Railroad
Kauai Railway
Koolau Railway
Oahu Railway and Land Company
West Hawaii Railway

Electric
Honolulu Rapid Transit and Land Company

Industrial Rail Operations

Island of Hawaii
 Hamakua Mill Company
 Kukaiau Plantation Company
 Hawaii Agricultural Company
 Honokaa Sugar Company
 Pacific Sugar Mill Company
 Hutchinson Sugar Plantation Company
 Kaiwiki Sugar Company, Ltd
 Kohala Sugar Company
 Kona Sugar Company
 Olaa Sugar Company
 Puna Sugar Company
 Hawaiian Mahogany Lumber Company
 Laupahohoe Sugar Company
 Paauhau Sugar Plantation Company
 Puako Plantation
 Waiakea Mill Company

Island of Kauai
 Grove Farm Company
 Hawaiian Sugar Company
 Kekaha Sugar Company
 Kilauea Sugar Plantation Company
 Koloa Sugar Company
 The Lihue Plantation Company
 Hanamauku Sugar Plantation
 Ahukini Terminal and Railway Company (absorbed by the Lihue Plantation)
 McBryde Sugar Company
 Eleele Plantation
 Kauai Railway Company (McBryde Sugar Company sponsored)
 Waimea Sugar Mill Company

Island of Lanai
 Maunalei Sugar Company

Island of Maui
 Hawaiian Commercial & Sugar Company
 Kihei Plantation Company
 Maui Agricultural Company
 Paia Plantation
 Kaeleku Sugar Company
 Hana Plantation Company
 Kipahulu Sugar Company
 Kaeleku Sugar Company
 Pioneer Mill Company
 Olowalu Sugar Company
 Wailuku Sugar Company

Island of Molokai
 American Sugar Company

Island of Oahu

 Ewa Plantation Company
 Heeia Agricultural Company
 Kahuku Plantation Company
 Koolau Railway Company (bought out by Kahuku Plantation Company)
 Hibiscus & Heliconia Short Line Railroad
 Oahu Sugar Company
 Honolulu Plantation Company
 Waiahole Water Company
 Waialua Agricultural Company
 Waianae Sugar Company
 Waimanalo Sugar Company

References

John B. Hungerford, Hawaiian Railroads, 1963. Reseda, California: Hungerford Press
Jesse C. Conde and Gerald M. Best, Sugar Trains, Narrow Gauge Rails of Hawaii, 1973. Fenton, California: Glenwood Publishers

Hawaii
 
 
Railroads